"King" is a song by British synth-pop trio Years & Years from their debut studio album Communion. It was originally released as a single on 3 February 2015. The song was released in the United Kingdom as a digital download on 1 March 2015 through Polydor Records.

The song entered at the top of the UK Singles Chart with a combined sales-streaming figure of 101,000 copies, making it Years & Years' first number-one single. Internationally, "King" peaked within the top ten of the charts in Australia, Austria, Bulgaria, Denmark, Germany, Luxembourg, the Netherlands, the Republic of Ireland and Switzerland.

Background
In an interview with Rolling Stone, frontman Olly Alexander said: "When we recorded [the song], no one felt good about it. It sounds lame! And we could never fix it. We shelved it for awhile. When we came back to it, we just took a different approach: 'Let's try to make it an Eighties dance-pop track.' And we just started out with that, cut it all up, arranged it. Used that balearic flute vibe, like a bird in the forest." Synth player Mikey Goldsworthy revealed that the backing track "[is] actually Olly's voice sampled and fucked up."

"King" was released as the album's fourth single on 27 February 2015. The song debuted at number one on the UK Singles Chart, with a combined sales-streaming figure of 101,000 copies, and reached number three on the Irish Singles Chart. Alexander has stated many times that the song has a much darker meaning: "I was going out with a guy that was kind of a douche bag, but I still really liked him". He further stated "I know lots of people can related to this. It's a song about how it feels good to be treated badly by someone".

Critical reception
"King" received critical acclaim. Billboard included "King" in its "Top 10 Songs of 2015 (So Far)" list in June 2015, stating "U.K. alt-pop trio Years & Years has yet to find a radio foothold in the States, but "King" sounds like it's destined to be played at arenas for years to come. When frontman Olly Alexander extends his arms and cries "Let go, let go, let go of everything" at the end of the single, it's almost impossible not to indulge in some type of uninhibited dance breakdown." Time named "King" the best song of 2015.

Music video
The song's music video was directed by Nadia and choreographed by Ryan Heffington.

The video features Olly in an empty house with a couch being surrounded by backup dancers. The two other band members, Mickey and Emre are playing an electric keyboard in an empty pink room being surrounded by dancers. Olly levitates out of the house and walks down the street with the dancers following him. As they fumble with him, he plunges into an underground river where the dancers rise him back up to the house and they struggle with him until he is able to break them free and learn they were a hallucination.

Live performances and covers

The band have performed the song on multiple TV shows including The Graham Norton Show (10 April), The Voice of Italy (27 May). They also performed the song as part of their set at Radio 1's Big Weekend (23 May), Glastonbury Festival (27 June), Wireless (5 July), T in the Park (11 July) and Latitude Festival (19 July). It is also the closing number on their Palo Santo Tour and Night Call Tour.

In April 2015, Nick Jonas performed an acoustic version of the song during Live Lounge on BBC Radio 1. The song was featured on the accompanied album. In September 2015, Canadian pop star Carly Rae Jepsen covered the song on BBC Radio 1.

Track listing
Digital download
"King" – 3:34

Digital download – Remixes
"King"  – 4:00
"King"  – 3:45
"King"  – 3:25

Digital download – Remixes
"King"  – 4:02
"King"  – 4:42
"King"  – 4:00
"King"  – 4:23
"King"  – 3:28
"King"  – 5:16
"King"  – 3:45
"King"  – 3:25

Charts

Weekly charts

Year-end charts

Decade-end charts

Certifications

Release history

References

External links
 

2015 songs
2015 singles
Years & Years songs
English house music songs
Number-one singles in Scotland
UK Singles Chart number-one singles
Interscope Records singles
Songs written by Mark Ralph (record producer)
Songs written by Olly Alexander
Song recordings produced by Mark Ralph (record producer)
LGBT-related songs